The 2009–10 Czech Cup was the seventeenth edition of the annual football knock-out tournament of the Czech Republic. It began on 19 July 2009 with the preliminary round. The final was held on 18 May 2010.

Teams

Preliminary round

|colspan="3" style="background-color:#97DEFF"|19 July 2009
{{OneLegResult|Radotín||3–2|Hořovicko}}

|-
|colspan="3" style="background-color:#97DEFF"|21 July 2009|}

First round

|colspan="3" style="background-color:#97DEFF"|25 July 2009|}

Second round

|colspan="3" style="background-color:#97DEFF"|2 September 2009|}

Third round

|colspan="3" style="background-color:#97DEFF"|23 September 2009'''

|}

Fourth round
The first legs of the fourth round were played on 7 October 2009, and the second legs were played on 28 October 2009.

|}

Quarterfinals
The first legs of the quarter-finals were played on 31 March 2010, and the second legs were played on 7 April 2010.

|}

Semifinals
The first legs of the semi-finals were played on 21 April 2010, and the second legs were played on 28 April 2010.

|}

Final

See also
 2009–10 Czech First League
 2009–10 Czech 2. Liga

References

External links
 Official site 
 soccerway.com

2009-10
2009–10 domestic association football cups
Cup